Carmichael House may refer to:

 Carmichael House (Macon, Georgia), a National Historic Landmark
 Carmichael House (Louisville, Kentucky), listed on the National Register of Historic Places (NRHP)
W. S. Carmichael House, Petoskey, Michigan
 Carmichael House (De Soto, Mississippi), listed on the NRHP